Saprospirales is an order of bacteria in the phylum Bacteroidota.

See also
 List of bacterial orders
 List of bacteria genera

References

Bacteroidota
Bacteria orders
Gram-negative bacteria